Yuan Guisen (born 1955) is a Chinese diplomat. He was the Ambassador of the People's Republic of China to Slovakia (1999–2003), Poland (2003–2007), Ecuador (2011–2013) and the Bahamas (since 2013).

References

1955 births
Living people
Ambassadors of China to Slovakia
Ambassadors of China to Poland
Ambassadors of China to Ecuador
Ambassadors of China to the Bahamas